Mahanoy may refer to:

Municipalities 
 Mahanoy City, Pennsylvania, a borough in Schuylkill County
 Mahanoy Township, Schuylkill County, Pennsylvania
 Little Mahanoy Township, Northumberland County, Pennsylvania
 Lower Mahanoy Township, Northumberland County, Pennsylvania
 Upper Mahanoy Township, Northumberland County, Pennsylvania
 West Mahanoy Township, Schuylkill County, Pennsylvania

Other 
 Mahanoy Creek, a tributary of the Susquehanna River in east central Pennsylvania
 Mahanoy Area School District, Schuylkill County, Pennsylvania
 State Correctional Institution – Mahanoy, a medium-security, correctional facility in Schuylkill County, Pennsylvania

See also 

 Mahanoy Plane, a railroad incline plane in east central Pennsylvania
 Lehigh and Mahanoy Railroad, an abandoned railroad in east central Pennsylvania